Jean Vigo (26 April 1905 – 5 October 1934) was a  French film director who helped establish poetic realism in film in the 1930s. His work influenced French New Wave cinema of the late 1950s and early 1960s.

Biography
Vigo was born to Emily Clero and the militant anarchist Miguel Almereyda. Much of Vigo's early life was spent on the run with his parents. His father was imprisoned and probably murdered in Fresnes Prison on 13 August 1917 although the death was officially a suicide. Some speculated that Almereyda's death was hushed up on orders of the Radical politicians Louis Malvy and Joseph Caillaux, who were later punished for wartime treason. The young Vigo was subsequently sent to boarding school under an assumed name, Jean Sales, to conceal his identity.

Vigo was married and had a daughter, Luce Vigo, a film critic, in 1931. He died in 1934 of complications from tuberculosis, which he had contracted eight years earlier.

Career
Vigo is noted for two films that affected the future development of both French and world cinema: Zero for Conduct (1933) and L'Atalante (1934).  Zero for Conduct was approvingly described by critic David Thomson in The New Biographical Dictionary of Film as "forty-four minutes of sustained, if roughly shot anarchic crescendo." L'Atalante was Vigo's only full-length feature. The simple story of a newly married couple splitting and reuniting effortlessly merges unpolished, naturalistic filmmaking with shimmering, dreamlike sequences and effects. Thomson described the result as "not so much a masterpiece as a definition of cinema, and thus a film that stands resolutely apart from the great body of films."

His career began with two other films: À propos de Nice ("about Nice," 1930), a subversive silent film that considered social inequity in the resort town of Nice and was inspired by Soviet newsreels; and Jean Taris, Swimming Champion (1931), a study of swimmer Jean Taris. None of his four films were financial successes; at one point, with his and his wife's health suffering, Vigo was forced to sell his camera.

Zero for Conduct was banned by the French government until after the war, and L'Atalante was mutilated by its distributor.  By this point, Vigo was too ill to strenuously fight the matter. Both films have outlived their detractors; L'Atalante was chosen as the 10th-greatest film of all time in Sight & Sound'''s 1962 poll, and as the 6th-best in its 1992 poll. In the late 1980s a 1934 copy of L'Atalante was found in the British National Film and Television Archive, and became a key element in the restoration of the film to its original version.

Writing on Vigo's career in The New York Times, film critic Andrew Johnston stated: "The ranks of the great film directors are short on Keatses and Shelleys, young artists cut off in their prime, leaving behind a handful of great works that suggest what might have been. But one who qualifies is Jean Vigo, the French director who died of tuberculosis at age 29 in 1934."

 Filmography 
 1930: À propos de Nice 1931: La Natation par Jean Taris or Taris, roi de l'eau 1933: Zéro de conduite 1934: L'AtalanteAwards
2011 Parajanov-Vartanov Institute Award posthumously honored Jean Vigo  for Zero for Conduct and was presented to his daughter and French film critic Luce Vigo. Martin Scorsese wrote a letter for the occasion with praise for Vigo, Sergei Parajanov and Mikhail Vartanov, all of whom struggled with heavy censorship.

Legacy
The Prix Jean Vigo is an annual award given since 1951 to outstanding French film directors.
The Jean Vigo Award is an annual prize given to Best Director at the Navarra Int'l Documentary Film Festival in Spain.Jean Vigo, a biographical play about Vigo by Paulo Emilio Salles GomezLove's A Revolution, a stage adaptation of the Gomez play by Chris WardVigo: Passion for Life, a 1998 British biopic based on the Ward play, starring James Frain

References

Bibliography

 
 
 
 
 

External links
 
 Senses of Cinema: Great Directors Critical Database
 Jean Vigo Anarchist Encyclopedia''
 Jean Vigo (Bibliotheca Augustana)
 Punto de Vista festival "sees Jean Vigo as a permanent point of reference and guide."

1905 births
1934 deaths
Film directors from Paris
French anarchists
20th-century deaths from tuberculosis
Burials at the Cimetière parisien de Bagneux
Tuberculosis deaths in France